Mooinooi is a platinum and palladium mining town in the North West province of South Africa, roughly halfway between Brits and Rustenburg.

Formerly a boomtown, the 2008 Global Financial Crisis had caused the town to go bust. Former miners lost their jobs and local services had gone out of business.

References

Populated places in the Madibeng Local Municipality